Pikmin Bloom is a 2021 augmented reality mobile game in the Pikmin series, developed and published by Niantic. Like Pokémon Go, it rewards players for spending time outside. The player's real-world movements are rewarded with items for Pikmin creatures. Its worldwide rollout began in late October 2021.

Gameplay
Pikmin Bloom is an augmented reality mobile game in the Pikmin series. For wandering and spending time outside, players are rewarded with items that can either grow or feed Pikmin creatures that appeared throughout the main Pikmin trilogy.

The walking player is depicted as a Nintendo Account Mii (or one with limited customization for those without such an account) leading Pikmin, creating a trail of blossoming flowers on the map, and the Pikmin can find items. This includes fruit and costumes. The Pikmin grow flowers on their heads when fed, which in turn can be used to plant more flowers on the map. Players can explore to collect flowers of different pigments specific to a location. There are planned, collaborative multiplayer events involving large flowers.

The game is free-to-play. Like Niantic's Pokémon Go, the player can use real-world money to purchase virtual coins to boost progress.

The player can take real photographs with virtual Pikmin. The lifelogging component, inspired by Olimar's daily ship logs from the first Pikmin game, encourages the player to make and caption photos for daily calendar entries. The game app connects with Apple Health and Google Fit to count steps but has no smartwatch connection.

Development
Niantic developed Pikmin Bloom under license from Nintendo after having previously collaborated on Pokémon Go.

It was first announced in 2021. Global rollout began in Australia and Singapore on October 27, 2021, North and South America on October 28, Japan on November 1, and lastly it was available worldwide by November 2.

Niantic has planned retail location partnerships.

Reception

Early reviewers likened Pikmin Bloom to a gamified fitness experience, similar to fitness apps that convert daily steps taken into coins and minigames.

Some Android users using Android 11 or 12 at the game's launch reported delayed notifications including SMS messages. Initial reports of the delayed notifications were reported during beta testing. Niantic acknowledged the issues on November 5 and released two updates which minimize the delayed notifications.

Pikmin Bloom was downloaded 2 million times in 2 weeks after its launch, and as of May 2022, the game has grossed $5.3 million since its release.

References

Further reading

External links

 

2021 video games
Android (operating system) games
Augmented reality games
Fitness games
Free-to-play video games
IOS games
Niantic, Inc. games
Location-based games
Pervasive games
Pikmin
Video games developed in the United States
Proprietary cross-platform software
Vertically-oriented video games